Le Tourment Vert (translated as "The Green Torment") was an absinthe-like liqueur imported from the French Distillerie Vinet EGE, near the French commune of Cognac. The spirit was created in 2007.

Le Tourment Vert was a mixed and macerated spirit containing the basic ingredients common to true absinthes - anise, fennel and grand wormwood (Artemisia absinthium) - and also contained a combination of herbs, including sage, rosemary, coriander, and eucalyptus and fitted within guidelines for thujone (10ppm) as specified by the U.S. Alcohol and Tobacco Tax and Trade Bureau.

Le Tourment Vert provoked criticism among absinthe connoisseurs for being atypical of historical absinthes. The color of Le Tourment Vert had been artificially altered for visual uniqueness, though many absinthe purists found the blue-green color to be unnatural in appearance.

The U.S. TTB has several classifications for absinthes and related spirits currently available for sale in the U.S., including "Other Herb & Seed Cordials/Liqueurs" and "Other Specialties & Proprietaries". Le Tourment Vert was classified as an "Other Herb & Seed Cordials/Liqueurs" because it was bottled with sugar, unlike true absinthes.

Reports of the brand being discontinued
Although there has been no official announcement, and bottles of it have been sold in liquor stores as recently as 2010, informed views within the absinthe community suggest that the brand has now been discontinued.

It can no longer be found via a shopping search on Google.com, or with the wholesalers who used to distribute it from 2007 onwards. The brand website is now just one page, and the social network feeds have been either removed (Facebook) or ceased to be supported (Twitter).

Notes

External links 
 Le Tourment Vert
 Absintheology

Alcoholic drink brands
Absinthes